Charlton Debono (born 11 August 1984) is a Maltese long-distance runner.

In 2018, he competed in the men's half marathon at the 2018 IAAF World Half Marathon Championships held in Valencia, Spain. He finished in 130th place. In 2020, he competed in the men's race at the 2020 World Athletics Half Marathon Championships held in Gdynia, Poland.

References

External links 
 

Living people
1984 births
Place of birth missing (living people)
Maltese male long-distance runners
Maltese male marathon runners